Iberospinus  or  (meaning "Iberian spine") is an extinct genus of spinosaurid dinosaur from the Early Cretaceous (Barremian) Papo Seco Formation of Portugal. The genus contains a single species, I. natarioi, known from several assorted bones belonging to one individual. Iberospinus represents one of three known spinosaurid taxa from the Iberian Peninsula, the others being Vallibonavenatrix, and Camarillasaurus. It is important for its implications of the geographical origin of Spinosauridae and the suggested presence of an at least semi-aquatic lifestyle early in the evolution of this clade.

Discovery and naming 
The first fossil material was discovered in 1999, with additional expeditions from 2004 to 2008. After being described as a specimen of Baryonyx in 2011, it was realised to have been a unique species in 2019. Additional material was discovered in a June 2020 expedition, after which Iberospinus was described as a new genus and species in 2022 by Octávio Mateus and Darío Estraviz-López. 

Iberospinus is currently known from dentary fragments, teeth, an incomplete right scapula, partial dorsal and caudal vertebrae, rib fragments, a partial pubis, two incomplete calcanea, and a pedal ungual phalanx. All of the material belongs to one individual. The holotype material represents one of the most complete spinosaurid specimens in the world.

Of the generic name, "Iberospinus," "ibero,"  is derived from Iberia, a Roman name for the Iberian Peninsula, while the Latin "spinus,"  or  means spine, after the elongated neural spines of related spinosaurids. The specific name, "natarioi,  " honors Carlos Natário, the discoverer of the holotype.

Description 

The dentary (lower jaw) of Iberospinus shows an intricate neurovascular system that would connect the teeth and the external foramina. A series of replacement teeth are also preserved in the dentary. Characteristics of the bones, especially in the tail and pedal ungual phalanx, indicate a possible semi-aquatic lifestyle, though the extreme features in some related spinosaurines are not seen.

The following autapomorphies distinguish Iberospinus. The dentary bone contains a single foramen within the Meckelian sulcus and has a straight ventral edge instead of curved as in most other spinosaurids. Laminae are present in the pleurocoelic depression of the mediodistal tail vertebrae. The shoulder blade has a straight anterior rim without a protruding acromion and a coracoidal contact occupying the entire ventral surface. The pubic apron is thick throughout the entire length of the pubic shaft. There is a mound-like eminence in the proximal lateral portion of the pubic bone.

Classification 
Iberospinus was recovered within the Spinosauridae, outside of both the Baryonychinae and the Spinosaurinae. However, Mateus & Estraviz-López (2022) explain that the fossil material shows some characteristics of baryonichines, suggesting a closer relation to the group. An adjusted cladogram after the describing authors is shown below:

Palaeoenvironment
The Papo Seco Formation of Portugal where Iberospinus is known from is composed of marl, representing a lagoon environment. Other dinosaur remains from the area include fragments tentatively assigned to Mantellisaurus, a macronarian sauropod, and Megalosaurus. Most of the bones of Iberospinus specimen ML1190 were damaged, and some scratches may be marks from small scavengers. The specimen's disarticulation indicates it was transported from a more-terrestrial environment (since many bones are missing), but those found were close together.

References 

Spinosaurids
Fossil taxa described in 2022
Fossils of Portugal
Barremian life
Early Cretaceous dinosaurs of Europe